Karnali may refer to:

Places in Nepal 
Karnali Bridge, a bridge over the Karnali River in Nepal
Karnali Highway, a vital transport link in Nepal
Karnali Province, a federal province in Nepal
Karnali River, a river in Nepal and India originating in the Tibetan Plateau
Karnali Zone, a former administrative zone in Nepal

Other 
Karnali Air, a defunct airline that operated in Nepal

See also 
Karnali Blues, a novel written by Nepali Buddhi Sagar